Organization for Black Struggle is a St. Louis, Missouri-based activist organization founded in 1980. The organization seeks "political empowerment, economic justice and the cultural dignity of the African-American community, especially the Black working class." Organization for Black Struggle gained national attention when it joined with other organizations to publicly seek justice in the shooting of Michael Brown by a police officer on 2014.

In 2010, Montague Simmons became the chair of  Organization for Black Struggle.

The organization was active in protests in Ferguson and St. Louis, Missouri, following to police shootings of Michael Brown and Vonderrit Myers Jr. in 2014.

References

External links

 
Activist groups in Saint Louis
African-American working class
Organizations based in St. Louis
Organizations established in 1980
African Americans' rights organizations
Shooting of Michael Brown
Working class in the United States
Political organizations based in St. Louis